Robert "Bob" Corbett (23 November 1895 – 10 June 1957) was an Australian rules footballer who played with Melbourne in the Victorian Football League (VFL).

Football
Corbett, a centreman, came originally from Ballarat team Golden Point and was already 24 by the time he made his VFL debut in 1920. He was a constant fixture in the Melbourne side during the 1920s and a regular interstate representative.

Just before half time in the 1926 Preliminary Final, Corbett was struck in the face and knocked to the ground by Essendon player Charlie May. Despite returning to the field later in the game, he missed out on playing in Melbourne's premiership win the following week, diagnosed with a broken jaw. A side result of this incident was the eventual introduction of a reserve that could replace injured players.

He acted as VFL boundary umpire after retiring and officiated in 40 matches from 1931 to 1933.

See also
 1927 Melbourne Carnival

Footnotes

References
 Atkinson, G. (1982) Everything you ever wanted to know about Australian rules football but couldn't be bothered asking, The Five Mile Press: Melbourne. .

 Ross, J. (ed), 100 Years of Australian Football 1897–1996: The Complete Story of the AFL, All the Big Stories, All the Great Pictures, All the Champions, Every AFL Season Reported, Viking, (Ringwood), 1996.

External links

 Bob Corbett, at Demonwiki
 Bob Corbett, at Boyles Football Photos

1895 births
1957 deaths
Australian rules footballers from Victoria (Australia)
Australian Rules footballers: place kick exponents
Melbourne Football Club players
Golden Point Football Club players
Australian Football League umpires
Australian military personnel of World War I